Wodonga Storm Junior Rugby League Football Club is an Australian rugby league football club based in Wodonga, Victoria. They conduct teams for both junior, senior and women tag teams.

See also

Rugby league in Victoria

References

External links
Wodonga Storm RLFC Fox Sports pulse
 

Rugby league teams in Victoria (Australia)
Rugby clubs established in 2005
2005 establishments in Australia
Wodonga